is one of the 100 Famous Japanese Mountains, reaching the height of . It is situated in Japan's Hida Mountains in Toyama Prefecture. It was specified for Chūbu-Sangaku National Park on December 4, 1934.

Outline 
There are a lot of mountains with the same name in Japan, but this is the highest peak. It is a mountain of the Faith for a long time as well as Mount Tate and Mount Ontake. Bhaisajyaguru is enshrined in the Shinto shrine on the top of the mountain.

History 
 It was the mountain of no admittance for women before the Meiji period.
 1885 – Benjamin Smith Lyman climbed this mountain and Mount Yari by the purpose of the measurement investigation etc.
 1904 – Geologist's Naomasa Yamasaki discovered Cirque on the east side of the mountain.
 1909 – English literature's Jūji Tanabe climbed, and published the book on travel of mountain.
 1926 – Writer Kyūya Fukada climbed, and published 100 Famous Japanese Mountains in 1964.
 December 4, 1934 – This area was specified to the Chūbu-Sangaku National Park.
 March 29, 1952 – The cirque of Mount Yakushi was specified for the special Natural monument.
 January 15, 1963 – 13 members of Aichi University met an accident in this mountain where a large amount of snows piled, and died.

Cirque on Mount Yakushi 

There are 4 large Cirque on the east side of the mountain.
 Northern cirque – It is not plain because it collapsed.
 Kanasaku valley cirque – This was originated by person's name of Kanasaku Miyamoto. It is between Mount kita-Yakushi and Mount Yakushi.
 Central cirque – It is on the southeast side of Mount Yakushi.
 Southern cirque – It is on the southeast of Central cirque.

Mountaineering

Main ascent routes 
There are several climbing routes to the top of the mountain.
 Entrance Arimine (Oritate) : Oritate – Tarōdaira hut – Yakushi mountain pass – Yakushi plain (Yakushi-daira) – Yakushi mountain cottage – Mount Yakushi. This is the shortest route.
 Hietsu-shin-dō (Hietsu new route) : Hietsu Tunnel – Sennin mountain pass – Kagami pond – Mount Teraji – Kitanomata hut – Tarōdaira hut – Yakushi mountain pass – Yakushi plain – Yakushi mountain cottage – Mount Yakushi. Also there is Kamioka-shin-dō (Kamioka new route) for Mount Teraji.
 From Mount Tate : Murodō – Mount Tate – Ichinokosi mountain cottage – Mount Shishi – Zara mountain pass – Goshikigahara – Mount Ecchuzawa – Sugonokkoshi hut – Hazama Mountain – Mount Kita-Yakushi – Mount Yakushi.
 From Mount Kurobegorō : Mount Kurobegorō – Mount Kitanomata – (Mount Tarō) – Tarōdaira hut – Yakushi mountain pass – Yakushi plain – Yakushi mountain cottage – Mount Yakushi. There are several route for Mount Kurobegorō.

Mountain hut 

Thera are several Mountain hut around Mount Yakushi. Yakushi mountain cottage is the nearest hut.
  – in the col between Mount Ecchuzawa and Mount Hazama (with Campsite), 50 person accommodation
  – between Mount Yakushi and Yakushi plain, 60 person accommodation
  – between Mount Taro and Kumonotaira, on Kurobe River ashore, 60 person accommodation
  – between Yakushi mountain pass and Mount Tarō (with Campsite on Yakushi mountain pass), 150 person accommodation
  – in the col between Mount Teraji and Mount Kitanomata (Shelter hut), 8 person accommodation
  – in the col between Mount Kurobegorō and Mount Mitsumatarenge (with Campsite), 60 person accommodation
  – in the col between Mount Mitsumatagenge and Mount Washiba (with Campsite), 70 person accommodation

Alpine plant 
The upper part of this mountain is situated in Tree line region, Siberian Dwarf Pine and Alpine plant grow naturally. There are quite a lot of kinds of alpine plant in the surrounding, and it is selected to "the 100 famous Japanese mountains of flower" by Sumie Tanaka.
 around Yakushi plain : Phyllodoce aleutica, Nephrophyllidium, Gentiana thunbergii var. minor, Anemone narcissiflora, Trollius japonicus, Siberian Dwarf Pine etc.
 around Yakushi mountain pass : Paris japonica, Maianthemum dilatatum, Caltha palustris etc.
 around Tarōdaira hut : Veratrum stamineum, Geum pentapetalum, Geranium yesoemse var. nipponicum, Lysichiton camtschatcense, Ranunculus acris, Pedicularis chamissonis var. japonica, Eriophorum vaginatum etc.

Geography

Nearby mountains

Rivers 
The mountain is the source of the following rivers, each of which flows to the Sea of Japan.
 tributary of the Jōganji River
 tributaries of the Kurobe River

Scenery of Mount Yakushi

References

See also

 Hida Mountains
 Chūbu-Sangaku National Park
 List of mountains in Japan
 100 Famous Japanese Mountains

Hida Mountains
Mountains of Toyama Prefecture
Sacred mountains of Japan